Seguenziopsis bicorona is a species of very small deep water sea snail, a marine gastropod mollusk in the family Seguenziidae.

Description
The nacreous, white shell is somewhat broader (2.45 mm) than high (2.1 mm). The thick shell has a narrow umbilicus.

References

 Marshall, B.A. 1983: Recent and Tertiary Seguenziidae (Mollusca: Gastropoda) from the New Zealand region. New Zealand Journal of Zoology 10: 235-262

External links
 To Encyclopedia of Life
 To World Register of Marine Species

bicorona
Gastropods described in 1983